is a passenger railway station located in the city of Takamatsu, Kagawa Prefecture, Japan. It is operated by JR Shikoku and has the station number "T21".

Lines
The station is served by the JR Shikoku Kōtoku Line and is located 12.3 km from the beginning of the line at Takamatsu. Only local services stop at the station.

Layout
Yakuriguchi Station consists of two opposed side platforms serving two tracks. Track 1 on the north side is the through-track while track 2 is the passing loop. There is no station building and the station is unstaffed but shelters are provided on both platforms for waiting passengers. Bth platforms also have a "Tickets Corner" (a small shelter housing an automatic ticket vending machine). Separate ramps lead up to each platform from the access road. There is no direct link between the platforms and a nearby road level crossing must be used. Bicycle parking is provided underneath platform 2.

History
Japanese National Railways (JNR) opened Yakuriguchi Station on 1 September 1961 as an added stop on the existing Kōtoku Line. With the privatization of JNR on 1 April 1987, JR Shikoku assumed control of the station.

Surrounding area
 Takamatsu City Hall Mure Branch
 Ōmachi Station on the Takamatsu Kotohira Electric Railway Shido Line 
 Yakuri-ji temple

See also
List of railway stations in Japan

References

External links

Station timetable

Railway stations in Kagawa Prefecture
Railway stations in Japan opened in 1961
Railway stations in Takamatsu